Photobacterium phosphoreum or Vibrio phosphoreum is a Gram-negative bioluminescent bacterium living in symbiosis with marine organisms, such as anglerfish.  It can emit bluish-green light (490 nm) due to a chemical reaction between FMN, luciferin and molecular oxygen catalysed by an enzyme called luciferase.

External links 
Piotr Madanecki's Website about Luminescent Bacteria
Isolation of P. phosphoreum Cultures from Seafish
Type strain of Photobacterium phosphoreum at BacDive -  the Bacterial Diversity Metadatabase

Vibrionales
Bioluminescent bacteria